Möhwald is a German-language surname. Notable people with this surname include:

Kevin Möhwald (born 1993), German footballer
Horst Möhwald (born 1938), German skier, competitor in the 1964 Winter Olympics
Robert Möhwald (1906–1978), Czech skier, competitor in the 1928 Winter Olympics (military patrol)
Willy Möhwald (1908–1975), Czech ski jumper, competitor in the 1928 Winter Olympics

German-language surnames